Johann Sebastian Bach composed the church cantata  (He who offers thanks praises Me), 17 in Leipzig for the fourteenth Sunday after Trinity and first performed it on 22 September 1726.

In his fourth year as Thomaskantor in Leipzig, Bach performed 18 cantatas composed by his relative Johann Ludwig Bach, a court musician in Meiningen. He then set some of the texts himself, including this cantata, written probably by Ernst Ludwig, Duke of Saxe-Meiningen. They follow a pattern: seven movements are divided in two parts, both beginning with biblical quotations, Part I from the Old Testament, Part II from the New Testament.

The text is based on the prescribed gospel reading telling of Jesus cleansing ten lepers. It is opened by a verse from Psalm 50, quotes a key sentence from the gospel and is closed by a stanza from Johann Gramann's hymn "". The cantata, structured in two parts to be performed before and after the sermon, is modestly scored for four vocal soloists and choir (SATB), and a Baroque orchestra of two oboes, strings and continuo.

History and words 

Bach wrote the cantata in 1726, his fourth year in Leipzig, for the 14th Sunday after Trinity. The prescribed readings for the Sunday were from the Epistle to the Galatians, Paul's teaching on "works of the flesh" and "fruit of the Spirit", and from the Gospel of Luke, Cleansing ten lepers..

That year, Bach presented 18 cantatas by his relative Johann Ludwig Bach who was court musician in Meiningen. Bach seems to have been impressed also by the texts of those cantatas and follows similar structures: seven movements, divided in two parts to be performed before and after the sermon, both parts opened by Bible words, Part I by a quotation from the Old Testament, Part II by one from the New Testament. Bach composes some texts that his relative set before, including this cantata, which was written by Ernst Ludwig, Duke of Saxe-Meiningen, according to Christoph Wolff. The cantata is regarded as part of Bach's third annual cycle.

The poet derived from the gospel idea that thanks to God for his goodness are man's obligation. A profound scholar of the Bible, he quotes for the opening chorus a verse from Psalm 50 and for the first recitative in Part II verses 15 and 16 from the gospel. The closing chorale is the third stanza of the hymn "" (1525) by Johann Gramann (Poliander).

Bach first performed the cantata on 22 September 1726. He later used the opening movement for the movement Cum sancto Spritu in the Gloria of his Missa in G major, BWV 236.

Music

Structure and scoring 

The cantata is structured in two parts, Part I of three movements to be performed before the sermon, Part II of four movements after the sermon. Bach scored it for four vocal soloists (soprano (S), alto (A), tenor (T) and bass (B)), a four-part choir SATB, and a Baroque instrumental ensemble of two oboes (Ob), two violins (Vl), two violas (Va) and basso continuo (Bc). The title of the autograph score reads: "Domin. 14 post Trin. / Wer Dank opfert, der preiset mich / a / 4 Voci / 2 Hautb. / 2 Viol. / Viola / e Contin. / di / J.S.Bach".

In the following table of the movements, the scoring follows the Neue Bach-Ausgabe. The keys and time signatures are taken from Alfred Dürr, using the symbol for common time (4/4).

Movements

1 
The opening chorus presents the verse from the psalm, "" (He who offers thanks praises Me), in two choral sections, preceded by a long instrumental section.

2 
The first recitative is secco, as the two others:  "" (The entire world must be a silent witness).

3 
In the first aria, "" (Lord, your goodness reaches as wide as Heaven), soprano and two obbligato violins illustrate in raising lines the text "" (as far as the clouds soar), adding extended coloraturas on "" (praise) and "" (indicate [the way]).

4 
The recitative beginning Part II, "" (One, however, among them, when he saw that he was cured), is of narrative character and therefore given to the tenor voice, similar to the Evangelist in Bach's Passions.

5 
The second aria, "" (What an abundance of goodness), is accompanied by the strings. Both arias share a structure of three vocal sections, avoiding a vocal da capo, but combining the last section with the ritornello, thus achieving a unity of the movement.

6 
The last recitative, "" (Look on my will), is sung by the bass. It is accompanied by the continuo alone and expands on the theme of giving thanks to God.

7 
John Eliot Gardiner admires particularly the closing chorale, "" (As a father has mercy), for its "wonderful word-painting for the 'flower and fallen leaves' and 'the wind [which] only has to pass over. He compares it to the central movement of the motet .

Recordings 
The sortable table follows the selection on the Bach Cantatas Website. Ensembles singing one voice per part (OVPP) and playing period instruments are marked by green background.

References

Sources 

 
 Wer Dank opfert, der preiset mich BWV 17; BC A 131 / Sacred cantata (14th Sunday after Trinity) Bach Digital
 BWV 17 Wer Dank opfert, der preiset mich: English translation, University of Vermont
 BWV 17.7 bach-chorales.com

Church cantatas by Johann Sebastian Bach
Psalm-related compositions by Johann Sebastian Bach
1726 compositions